Biagi-DenBeste Racing, originally Biagi Brothers Racing, was an American professional stock car racing team that last competed in the NASCAR Xfinity Series in partnership with Stewart-Haas Racing. The team was based in Mooresville, North Carolina.

Xfinity Series

Car No. 98 history

2001–2006
The team debuted in 2001 at the Auto Club 300 as the No. 4 car, qualifying 41st and finishing 31st with Mike Wallace driving their Chevrolet. Wallace made eight starts total that season, his best finish a tenth at Richmond International Raceway. Wallace returned in 2002, running seventeen races. He finished in the top-twenty seven times, including two fourteenth-place finishes. The team also ran a second car, the No. 07, for Tim Fedewa at Talladega, finishing third, the last car on the lead lap (mostly due to a 27-car pileup on lap 15 that took out most of the field, including Wallace).

In 2003, Biagi moved up to the Busch Series full-time with Wallace. They opened the season with a fourth-place finish at the Koolerz 300. Despite missing a race where Rick Carelli filled in, Wallace finished thirteenth in points that year, one position shy of matching his career-best. The following season, Biagi switched from Chevrolets to Fords, and at the Winn-Dixie 250, Wallace took the lead on the last lap to score Biagi's first career Busch victory. He led eighteen laps the following week at Chicagoland Speedway, but ran out of fuel on the last lap, costing him the victory. After posting three more top-tens, Wallace finished seventeenth in points.

After Wallace departed in 2005, Biagi formed a partnership with Chip Ganassi Racing and hired Ganassi development driver Ryan Hemphill. After he failed to qualify for two consecutive races, Hemphill was briefly replaced by Jeff Green, who finished sixth at Richmond. Hemphill returned for three races and had a twelfth-place run at Nashville Superspeedway before he was permanently removed from the ride. Green took over for three races, before Kevin Hamlin took over for the balance of the season. In fourteen starts, his best finish was fourteenth at Memphis Motorsports Park.

For 2006, Mark Green was selected as the team's new driver, and had an eighteenth-place run at Richmond, before he was released in favor of Auggie Vidovich. In addition to Green and Vidovich, Hamlin, Boris Said, and Paul Tracy have driven the car during the 2006 season.

In 2007, BDBR had announced it would switch to Toyota and run with sponsorship from Kibbles 'n Bits, but the team shut down in January due to a lack of funding. Its assets and owners points were acquired by Braun Racing, and the team's number, 4, assigned to Ginn Racing.

2012–present

Five years later, the team returned at Charlotte Motor Speedway in May 2012, with a new sponsor in Caroll Shelby Engine Company (owned by new partners Bill and Lori DenBeste), a new manufacturer Ford, and a new number 98 car being driven by Reed Sorenson. The car was given a black and gold scheme to honor the late Carroll Shelby and Shelby American's 50th Anniversary. Sorenson finished 16th in the team's return, then finished 13th in their next race at Kentucky. The team dedicated their third race of the season, at the famed Indianapolis Motor Speedway, to Shelby, though Sorenson would finish 34th after a crash. He would run two more races, with a crash at Atlanta and a 12th place and the second Charlotte race. Sprint Car standout and ARCA Racing Series winner Kevin Swindell was signed for two races at the end of the season. He finished a strong 9th at Texas, then placed 21st at the season-finale at Homestead Miami Speedway.

For 2013, Kevin Swindell was signed to run 15 races for the team, beginning at Las Vegas in March. The team partnered with Swindell's long time supporter Mike Curb, who became the listed owner of the No. 98 car (as well as the No. 98 car of Phil Parsons Racing in the Cup Series and the No. 98 truck of Johnny Sauter and ThorSport Racing in the Truck Series). Swindell had two top 10s, though he failed to qualify in their first attempt at Las Vegas.

In 2014, the team returned again with veteran David Ragan as well as up-and-comers Jeb Burton and Corey LaJoie; all three are the sons of former racers. Drive for Diversity and NASCAR Next member Ryan Gifford was signed to run two races for the team: Iowa in May and Kentucky in June. Gifford finished 20th in his only appearance at Iowa. After winning the Coke Zero 400 at Daytona and earning a spot in the Chase for the Sprint Cup, Aric Almirola signed on to pilot the 98 during two companion races at Chicagoland and Dover in September. Cup sponsor Smithfield Foods would come on to sponsor Almirola's efforts. Almirola started 10th and finished 14th in his debut for the team at Chicagoland, then 13th at Dover. After running one race earlier in the year, it was announced that Corey LaJoie would return to the No. 98 car for four additional races (Kansas, Charlotte, Texas, and Homestead), with backing from Richard Petty Motorsports primary investor Medallion Financial.

In 2015, Richard Petty Motorsports Sprint Cup drivers Almirola and Sam Hornish Jr. split time driving the No. 98, with sponsorship from both RPM's Cup sponsors and Biagi-DenBeste's regular sponsors. Almirola finished 7th in the season opener at Daytona, while Hornish finished 15th the next week at Atlanta. RPM development driver Ryan Truex drove four races, starting at Richmond.

In 2016, Almirola drove on a partial schedule starting at Daytona. Almirola won the 2016 Subway Firecracker 250 at Daytona to give the team their second ever win. Jeb Burton will drive two races in the No. 98 car starting with Indy, Richmond, and Charlotte with Estes sponsoring. 2014-15 Formula E Champion Nelson Piquet Jr. will drive the No. 98 car at Mid-Ohio Sports Car Course.

In 2017, it was announced that Aric Almirola would return to Biagi-DenBeste with the addition of Casey Mears. On May 6, 2017 Aric Almirola won the 2017 Sparks Energy 300 at Talladega Superspeedway.

On October 23, 2017, it was announced that in 2018 the team would partner with Stewart-Haas Racing under the name Stewart-Haas Racing with Biagi-DenBeste with Cole Custer driving the No. 00 full time and Kevin Harvick driving the No. 98 part time. It was later announced that Chase Briscoe would drive the No. 98 in at least one race.

Footnotes

References

External links

2001 establishments in North Carolina
2019 disestablishments in North Carolina
American auto racing teams
Auto racing teams established in 2001
Auto racing teams disestablished in 2019
Companies based in North Carolina
NASCAR teams